Live at Billy Bob's Texas may refer to:

Live at Billy Bob's Texas (Lynn Anderson album), 2000
Live at Billy Bob's Texas (Janie Fricke album), 2002
Live at Billy Bob's Texas (Stoney LaRue album)
Live at Billy Bob's Texas (Michael Martin Murphey album)
Live at Billy Bob's Texas (Willie Nelson album), 2004
Live at Billy Bob's Texas (Randy Rogers Band album)
Live at Billy Bob's Texas (Tanya Tucker album)

See also
Billy Bob's, a nightclub in Texas where these albums were recorded